Stu Wilson (born 22 July 1954, in Gore) is a former New Zealand rugby union player. He played for Wellington and New Zealand, captaining the national team in the 1983 tour of Scotland and England.

He played with the All Blacks as a wing from 1976 to 1983, scoring 50 tries (including non-test tries) for his country. He also played 89 matches for Wellington for whom he scored 54 tries, giving him a first-class total of 104 tries. He retired from the game, still in his prime, in 1984. Following retirement, Wilson became a rugby commentator, working on television and radio.

Books
 "Ebony and Ivory", 1984 - with Bernie Fraser

References

External links
 
Stu Wilson's daughter, Livvy Wilson is a member of the NZ Women's  Relay Team that competes Internationally, and has medalled in NZ 100/200m finals, although never winning Gold, except for Auckland in  Relays Finals

1954 births
New Zealand international rugby union players
Living people
Rugby union wings
People from Gore, New Zealand
People educated at Wairarapa College
Rugby union players from Southland, New Zealand